NewsNation with Tamron Hall was an American weekday talk-news program that was broadcast on MSNBC between 2010 and 2017. It launched on October 11, 2010. Tamron Hall anchors the hour broadcast from New York. The show concentrated on high-profile interviews and the latest U.S., world and entertainment news. When a story was deemed breaking news, MSNBC producers had the discretion to replace Hall with Breaking News Anchor Brian Williams.

Segments
Gut Check - Tamron asked viewers to give their opinion (using her Newsvine) on some of the most controversial stories in the news.

References

2010s American television news shows
2010 American television series debuts
2017 American television series endings
MSNBC original programming